The Gdecouv'R 582 is a French ultralight trike, designed by Jean-Michel Geay and produced by Gdecouv'R of Fontaine-lès-Dijon. The aircraft is supplied as a complete ready-to-fly aircraft.

Design and development
The designer was a former employee of Cosmos ULM before that company went out of business. His new company, Gdecouv'R, started out as a parts manufacturer supplying Cosmos owners, before he developed his own aircraft, based on Cosmos designs.

It features a cable-braced hang glider-style high wing, weight-shift controls, a two-seats-in-tandem open cockpit, tricycle landing gear and a single engine in pusher configuration.

The aircraft is made from bolted-together aluminum tubing, with its double surface wing covered in Dacron sailcloth. Its standard equipment  span La Mouette wing is supported by a single tube-type kingpost and uses an "A" frame weight-shift control bar. The powerplant is a twin-cylinder, liquid-cooled, two-stroke, dual-ignition  Rotax 582 engine.

A number of different wings can be fitted to the basic carriage, including those produced by La Mouette.

Specifications (582)

References

External links

2000s French sport aircraft
2000s French ultralight aircraft
Single-engined pusher aircraft
Ultralight trikes